The Terror of Bar X is a 1927 American silent Western film directed by Scott Pembroke and starring Bob Custer, Ruby Blaine and William Ryno.

Cast
 Bob Custer as Bob Willis 
 Ruby Blaine as Dorothy Hunter 
 William Ryno as Ross Hunter 
 Jack Castle as Reginald Brooks 
 Duke R. Lee as Jim Ashland 
 Walter Maly as Hoke Channing 
 Roy Bassett as Sheriff

References

Bibliography
 Munden, Kenneth White. The American Film Institute Catalog of Motion Pictures Produced in the United States, Part 1. University of California Press, 1997.

External links
 

1927 films
1927 Western (genre) films
Films directed by Scott Pembroke
American black-and-white films
Film Booking Offices of America films
Silent American Western (genre) films
1920s English-language films
1920s American films